Thiorhodospira sibirica is a species of alkaliphilic purple sulfur bacterium. It is strictly anaerobic, vibrioid- or spiral-shaped (3-4μm wide and 7-20 μm long) and motile by means of a polar tuft of flagella.

References

Further reading

Moskalenko, A. A., et al. "Some Spectral Characteristics of Pigment–Protein Complexes and Their Interaction in Membranes of Thiorhodospira sibirica."Doklady Biochemistry and Biophysics. Vol. 382. No. 1. MAIK Nauka/Interperiodica, 2002.

External links
LPSN

Chromatiales